Maccabi Tel Aviv have qualified for UEFA competitions on seventeen occasions. This list details their matches in the various competitions.

History
Maccabi Tel Aviv's European history began in 1992 when the Israeli Football Association joined UEFA. 1992–93 was Maccabi's first European season. On 19 August 1992, Maccabi won 2-1 their first match against Valletta F.C. in Malta. Maccabi Tel Aviv qualified twice to the Champions League group stage in seasons 2004–05 and 2015–16. in 2013–14 and 2020–21 Europa League season Maccabi qualified to the Round of 32 stage.

List of matches in European competitions

Before joining UEFA

After joining UEFA

 Legend:
 P = preliminary round
 Q = qualification round
 R = round
 PO = Play-off round
 KOPO = Knockout round play-off

By Competitions
Correct as of 25 August 2022

Before joining UEFA

List of matches in Asian competitions

1 The match was awarded to Maccabi Tel Aviv as Aliyat Al-Shorta refused to play for political reasons.

UEFA Team Ranking

 Bold row separators indicate change of ranking system.
 Italic font indicate ongoing season.

Record by country of opposition
Correct as of 25 August 2022.

Achievements in Europe

Maccabi Tel Aviv in European group stages

Champions League

2004–05 Group C

2015–16 Group G

Europa League

2011–12 Group E

2013–14 Group F

2016–17 Group D

2017–18 Group A

2020–21 Group I

Europa Conference League

2021–22 Group A

Maccabi Tel Aviv in European knockout phases

Europa League

2013–14 – Round of 32

2020–21 – Round of 32

Europa Conference League

2021–22 – Knockout round play-offs

Notes

References

Maccabi Tel Aviv F.C.
Israeli football clubs in international competitions